The 2010 Ohio gubernatorial election took place on November 2, 2010. Incumbent Democratic Governor Ted Strickland ran for re-election to a second term as governor and was opposed by former U.S. Representative John Kasich; both Strickland and Kasich won their respective primaries uncontested. The race between the two major candidates was prolonged and brutal, with both candidates employing various campaign surrogates to bolster their campaigns. Ultimately, Kasich narrowly defeated Strickland in one of Ohio's closest gubernatorial elections in history. This was the first election since  1946 in which an incumbent Democratic Ohio governor lost re-election to someone other than Jim Rhodes.

Strickland's defeat was widely attributed to the decline of Ohio's economy, as well as the loss of 400,000 jobs since the beginning of his term. The policies of the then-president Barack Obama proved to be a hot topic among voters, with Strickland voicing his support for the healthcare overhauls initiated by Obama's administration, contrary to Kasich, who opposed the policies.

Democratic primary

Candidates
Ted Strickland, incumbent Governor of Ohio

Results

Republican primary

Candidates
John Kasich, former U.S. Representative, Chairman of the House Budget Committee and candidate for president in 2000

Results

Libertarian primary

Candidates
 Ken Matesz

Results

Green primary

Candidates
Dennis Spisak, former congressional candidate

Results

General election

Predictions

Polling

Results
When the polls closed on election night, the race was very close, with Strickland and Kasich neck and neck. As the night wore on, Kasich's lead began to pick up strength, however once Cuyahoga County came in, Kasich's lead began to erode. In the end Kasich still won, but it was one of the closest gubernatorial elections in Ohio history. Strickland conceded at around 2 A.M. EST.

References

External links
Elections & Ballot Issues at the Ohio Secretary of State
Candidates for Ohio State Offices at Project Vote Smart 
Campaign contributions for 2010 Ohio Governor from Follow the Money
2010 Ohio Gubernatorial General Election: John Kasich (R) vs Ted Strickland (D) graph of multiple polls from Pollster.com
Election 2010: Ohio Governor from Rasmussen Reports
2010 Ohio Governor – Kasich vs. Strickland from Real Clear Politics
2010 Ohio Governor's Race from CQ Politics
Race Profile in The New York Times
Debates
Ohio Gubernatorial Debate, C-SPAN, September 14, 2010
Official campaign websites (Archived)
John Kasich for Governor
Ken Matesz for Governor
Dennis Spisak for Governor
Ted Strickland for Governor incumbent

Gubernatorial
2010
Ohio
John Kasich